Petyt is a surname. Notable people with the surname include:

K. M. Petyt (born 1941), sociolinguist and historian
William Petyt (1640/1641–1707), English barrister and writer
Cyriak Petyt (by 1517–before 1591), English politician
Maria Petyt (1623–1677), Flemish mystic